Oleg Daniilovich Danilov (26 October 1949 – 2 January 2021) was a Russian playwright and screenwriter best known for collaborating with film director Dmitry Astrakhan.
.

He died of COVID-19 in Minsk at the age of 71 during the COVID-19 pandemic in Belarus.

References

External links

1949 births
2021 deaths
Soviet dramatists and playwrights
Soviet screenwriters
Russian male dramatists and playwrights
20th-century Russian screenwriters
Male screenwriters
20th-century Russian male writers
Deaths from the COVID-19 pandemic in Belarus